Demi Lovato: Simply Complicated is a 2017 documentary film about the life and career of American singer, songwriter, and actor Demi Lovato, released on YouTube on October 17, 2017 in support of her sixth studio album Tell Me You Love Me. A director's cut of the documentary including 10 minutes of additional footage was later released on YouTube Premium in December 2017.

Simply Complicated chronicles both the recording of Tell Me You Love Me as well as events in Lovato's life and career that she had not previously disclosed or discussed extensively, including the beginning of her career on Disney Channel and various personal struggles with mental health and addiction. Lovato also admitted to being dishonest about the initial outcome of her recovery in a previous documentary, Demi Lovato: Stay Strong (2012), and revealed she was in fact under the influence of cocaine while being interviewed about her sobriety for that film.

Synopsis
Simply Complicated follows the recording of Lovato's sixth studio album Tell Me You Love Me and features appearances and commentary by several music producers, including Mitch Allan and Oak Felder. The documentary also chronicles Lovato's life and career up until 2017, including her upbringing and early career as a child star on Barney & Friends and later as a teenager on Disney Channel, as well as her first stint in rehab in 2010 for an eating disorder and emotional issues and her subsequent struggles with bipolar disorder and addiction. Lovato's mother Dianna De La Garza and sisters Dallas Lovato and Madison De La Garza also appear, discussing Lovato's talent from an early age as well as her biological father, who was abusive and suffered from alcoholism and substance abuse. The film also features appearances and commentary from Lovato's manager and life coach at the time, Phil McIntyre and Mike Bayer.

Awards and nominations

The film was nominated at the 2018 MTV Movie & TV Awards as Best Music Documentary.
The film was also nominated at the 2019 Realscreen Awards for Non-Fiction: Arts & Culture.

Notes

References

External links
 Official documentary
 

2017 documentary films
2017 films
American documentary films
Demi Lovato
Documentary films about singers
2010s English-language films
2010s American films